East Timor competed at the 2016 Winter Youth Olympics in Lillehammer, Norway from 12 to 21 February 2016.

Alpine skiing

Alexi Goutt was set to make his nation's Winter Youth Olympic debut after qualifying in alpine skiing. Despite appearing at the opening ceremony he did not participate in any event.

See also
East Timor at the 2016 Summer Olympics

References

2016 in East Timor
Nations at the 2016 Winter Youth Olympics
East Timor at the Youth Olympics